Traditional Thai clothing is called chut thai, which literally means 'Thai outfit'. It can be worn by men, women, and children. Chut thai for women usually consists of a pha nung or a pha chung hang, a blouse, and a pha biang. Northern and northeastern women may wear a pha sin instead of a pha nung and a pha chung hang with either a blouse or a suea pat. Chut thai for men includes a pha chung hang or pants, a Raj pattern shirt, with optional knee-length white socks and a pha biang. Chut Thai for northern Thai men is composed of a kangkeng sado, a white Manchu-styled jacket, and sometimes a khian hua. In formal occasions, people may choose to wear a so-called formal Thai national costume.

History

Historically, both Thai males and females dressed themselves with a loincloth wrap called pha chung hang. Men wore their pha chung hang to cover the waist to halfway down the thigh, whilst women wore their pha chung hang down the waist to well below the knee. Members of the nobility wore silk robes called khrui and a tall, pointed hat called lomphok in attendance of  royal affairs. Bare chests and bare feet were accepted as part of the Thai formal dress code, and are observed in murals, illustrated manuscripts, and early photographs up to the middle–1800s. Prior to the 20th century, the primary markers that distinguished class in Thai clothing were the use of cotton and silk cloths with printed or woven motifs, but both commoners and royals alike wore wrapped, not stitched clothing. Traditional Thai attire changed significantly during the Rattanakosin period.

Prior to the 1700s, Thai men and women both kept their hair long. However, following the Burmese–Siamese wars of 1759-1760 and 1765–1767 and repeated Burmese invasions into Ayutthaya, central Thai women began cutting their hair in a crew-cut short style, which remained the national hairstyle until the 1900s.

From the 1860s onward, Thai royals "selectively adopted Victorian corporeal and sartorial etiquette to fashion modern personas that were publicized domestically and internationally by means of mechanically reproduced images." Stitched clothing, including court attire and ceremonial uniforms, were invented during the reign of King Chulalongkorn. Western forms of dress became popular among urbanites in Bangkok during this period.
During the early–1900s, King Chulalongkorn encouraged Thai women to wear long hair instead of traditional short hair which later became a trend during the reign of King Vajiravudh along with wearing pha sin (ผ้าซิ่น), a tubular skirt, instead of the pha chung hang (โจงกระเบน), a cloth wrap.

On 15 January 1941, Plaek Pibulsonggram issued a Thai cultural mandate to modernize and Westernize Thai dress, by deeming the long-practiced customs of wearing underpants, wearing no shirt, or wearing a wraparound cloth, as forms of inappropriate public attire.

Traditional Costumes

Pha chung hang

Pha chung hang or Chang kben is a lower-body, wrap around cloth. It is synonymous with the Khmer sampot. The pha chung hang is a long, rectangular cloth worn around the lower body. The traditional dress is similar to the dhoti of South Asia. The pha chung hang resembles pants more than skirts. It is a rectangular piece of cloth measuring three meters long and one meter wide. It is worn by wrapping around the waist, stretching it away from the body, twisting the ends together then pulling the twisted  between the legs and tucking it in the back of the waist.

Pha nung

The pha nung, also known as pha sin or pha thung, is a long fabric worn around the waist that resembles a long skirt.

Pha biang

Pha biang or Sbai is shawl-like garment, or breast cloth. Pha Biang can be used by women or men. The Pha Biang is also known as a long piece of silk, about a foot wide, draped diagonally around the chest by covering one shoulder which its end drops behind the back. Pha Biang could be worn around the naked chest or on top of another cloth. The practice of wearing Pha Biang along with Victorian era costumes was a common practice during the reign of King Chulalongkorn and lasted until the reign of King Vajiravudh when Westernized clothing became more fashionable. The wearing of Pha Biang as daily wear was officially banned by Plaek Pibulsonggram during Thailand's clothing reform.

Suea pat

Suea pat is a long-sleeved shirt with no buttons. It is worn by wrapping the right side of the front panel of the shirt over the left side of the front panel, and the two panels are tied together via strings. Suea pats are typically worn by northern Thai women

Raj pattern

Raj pattern refers either to a Thai men's costume consisting of a white Nehru-style jacket with five buttons, a pha chung hang, knee-length socks, and dress shoes, or to the specific form of the jacket itself. It was worn chiefly during the late-19th and early-20th centuries by government officials and the upper class in Bangkok, and nowadays is used in select circumstances as a national costume.

Formal costume

The formal Thai costume,  (literally, 'Thai dress of royal endorsement'), includes several sets of dress, designed as the Thai national costume at formal occasions. Although described and intended for use as national costume, it is of relatively modern origins, having been conceived in the second half of the 20th century.

See also
Xout lao
Raj pattern
History of Thai clothing
Formal Thai national costume
Culture of Thailand
School uniforms in Thailand

References

Further reading
Conway, Susan, and Mūnnithi Čhēm ʻĒt Dapbœ̄nyū Thō̜msan. Power dressing: Lanna Shan Siam 19th century court dress. Bangkok: James H.W. Thompson Foundation, 2003.
Conway, Susan. Thai Textiles. London: British Museum Press, 1992.
Lu, Sylvia. Handwoven Textiles of South-East Asia. Singapore: Oxford University Press, 1988.
Meanmas, Chavalit. Costumes in ASEAN. Thailand: The National ASEAN Committee on Culture and Information of Thailand, 2000.
Wee, C. J. Wan. Local cultures and the "new Asia": The State, Culture, and Capitalism in Southeast Asia. Singapore: Institute of Southeast Asian Studies, 2002.

External links
Traditional Thai Hairstyles
Queen Sirikit Museum of Textiles
Traditional Thai Costumes
Thai National Costume
The Formal Thai National Costume
Thai National Costume in Thailand

Thai tradition
Thai clothing
Thai culture